Martijn Wydaeghe (born 1 September 1992) is a Belgian rallying co-driver. He is partnered with Thierry Neuville for Hyundai Motorsport in the World Rally Championship category.

Rally career
Wydaeghe made his WRC debut at the 2013 Rallye de France-Alsace. He is set to co-drive with five-time runner-up Thierry Neuville, replacing compatriot Nicolas Gilsoul.

Rally victories

WRC victories

Rally results

WRC results

* Season still in progress.

References

External links

 
 Martijn Wydaeghe's e-wrc profile
 Martijn Wydaeghe's profile at Hyundai

1992 births
Living people
Belgian rally co-drivers
World Rally Championship co-drivers
People from Izegem
Sportspeople from West Flanders